Vaillac (Languedocien: Valhac) is a former commune in the Lot department in south-western France. On 1 January 2016, it was merged into the new commune of Cœur de Causse.

Geography
The village lies in the middle of the commune, in the valley of the Foulon, a stream tributary of the Céou, which flows westward through the northern part of the commune. There is a castle on the hill overlooking the village that is occasionally open to the public.

Sights and monuments
 The Château de Vaillac is a castle containing elements from the 14th, 15th, 16th and 17th centuries.
 Église Saint-Julien, 14th - 15th century church

See also
Communes of the Lot department

References

Former communes of Lot (department)